Battle of Flores may refer to:

 Battle of Flores (1591)
 Battle of Flores (1592)